is a private junior college in Kurashiki, Okayama, Japan.

History 
Sakuyo Junior College of Music was founded in 1951. In 1996, part of the campus was opened in the city of Okayama. The Tsuyama campus closed in 1999.

Courses offered 
 Music

See also 
 List of junior colleges in Japan

References

External links 
  

Japanese junior colleges
1951 establishments in Japan
Universities and colleges in Okayama Prefecture
Private universities and colleges in Japan